WD J2356−209 (also known as WD 2354−211) is a white dwarf star located 65 pc (212 ly) away from the Earth. It is a very faint white dwarf, with an apparent visual magnitude of 21.03. Its visible spectrum is dominated by a broad absorption feature that has been attributed to pressure-broadened sodium D lines. The presence of this sodium absorption feature and the detection of spectral lines from other heavy elements (calcium, iron and magnesium) indicate that the photosphere of WD J2356−209 has been polluted by a recent rocky debris accretion episode. A detailed analysis of the spectrum of WD J2356−209 shows that the accreted planetesimal was abnormally sodium-rich, containing up to ten times more sodium than calcium. With an effective temperature of 4040 K, WD J2356−209 is the coolest metal-polluted white dwarf observed to date (and also the oldest, with a white dwarf cooling age of about 8 Gyr).

References

External links
 Too much sodium turns a star blue 25 February 2019, Nathalie Ouellette

White dwarfs
Cetus (constellation)